The 2017 Team Speedway Junior European Championship was the 10th Team Speedway Junior European Championship season. It was organised by the Fédération Internationale de Motocyclisme and was the 6th as an under 21 years of age event.

The final took place on 16 September 2017 in Krosno, Poland. The defending champions Poland won the final once again to record their sixth consecutive title.

Results

Final
  Krosno
 16 September 2017

See also 
 2017 Team Speedway Junior World Championship
 2017 Individual Speedway Junior European Championship

References 

2017
European Team Junior